The 1889 All-Ireland Senior Football Championship was the third staging of Ireland's premier Gaelic football knock-out competition. 1887 All Ireland champions Limerick were not part of the Munster championship. Tipperary were the champions.

Format
Only two provincial championship were played: Leinster and Munster. The winners met in the All-Ireland final.

Representative clubs

From 1887 until 1891 the club champions represented the whole county.

Results

Leinster

The Wicklow–Laois game was later ordered to be played again, and so the final had to be played again as well.

Munster

All-Ireland final

Championship statistics

Miscellaneous
 Tipperary win the first All Ireland title.

References

All-Ireland Senior Football Championship